Desirée Ndjambo León (born 17 October 1976) is a Spanish journalist and presenter.

She is a graduate in Journalism from the Universidad Carlos III and has a Diploma from the Universidad Complutense de Madrid. Ndjambo presented the sports section of the morning edition of Telediario on La 1 channel and with Ainhoa Arbizu she has presented the Moto GP World Championship for TVE. She now presents La 2 Noticias. Her father is from Equatorial Guinea and works as a technician at TVE.

References

1976 births
Living people
Women sports journalists
Spanish women journalists
People from Madrid
Charles III University of Madrid alumni
Spanish people of Equatoguinean descent
Spanish women television presenters